Phyllotopsis  nidulans, commonly known as the mock oyster or the orange oyster, is a species of fungus in the family Phyllotopsidaceae, and the type species of the genus Phyllotopsis. It is widely dispersed in temperate zones of the Northern Hemisphere, where it grows on decaying wood. On the cap underside are crowded orange gills. Mock oyster mushrooms have a strong, unpleasant odor, and are regarded as inedible though nonpoisonous.

Taxonomy

The mock oyster was first described scientifically in 1798 by Christian Hendrik Persoon as Agaricus nidulans. The specific epithet nidulans means "partly encased or lying in a cavity". It is commonly known as "nestcap".

Description

The flesh has a sulphurous odor similar to rotten cabbage or rotten eggs. Although it is not known to be poisonous, its disagreeable odor would deter most from eating the mushrooms.

The stems are either very short or nonexistent.

The spore print is pink. The smooth, sausage-shaped to cylindrical spores measure 5–7 µm long by 2–3 µm wide. Clamp connections are present in the hyphae.

Similar species

Phyllotopsis subnidulans, found in the eastern US, is similar in appearance to P. nidulans. The former species can be distinguished by a deeper orange color, thinner gills with wider inter-gill spacing, and curved to sausage-shaped spores. Other similar species include Lentinellus ursinusus, Crepidotus mollis, Panus rudis, Panus conchatus, and Pleurotus ostreatus.

Habitat and distribution

Fruit bodies grow singly or in overlapping clusters on dead wood. Phyllotopsis nidulans is widely distributed in temperate regions of the Northern Hemisphere. Its range extends north to Alaska, and includes Costa Rica, where it has been recorded in the Talamanca mountains and on the Poas Volcano. In Asia, it has been recorded in Korea.

Chemistry

The predominant pigments in the fruit bodies include beta-carotene (58%), alpha-carotene (29%), echinenone (8%), and astaxanthin (4%). P. nidulans also produces a  unique amino acid, 3-(3-carboxyfuran-4-yl) l-alanine

References

External links

Fungi described in 1798
Fungi of Asia
Fungi of Central America
Fungi of Europe
Fungi of North America
Inedible fungi
Taxa named by Christiaan Hendrik Persoon